Pallister–Hall syndrome (PHS) is a rare genetic disorder that affects various body systems. It is caused by a mutation in the GLI3 gene. The main features are a non-cancerous mass on the hypothalamus (hypothalamic hamartoma) and extra digits (polydactylism). The prevalence of Pallister-Hall Syndrome is unknown. About 100 cases have been reported in publication.

History
The syndrome was originally described by American geneticists Philip Pallister and Judith Hall in their research of newborn deaths.  Subsequent discovery of living children and adults expanded the understanding of the syndrome and established the familiar transmission pattern.

Physical Presentation
Most people with this condition have extra fingers and/or toes (polydactyly), and the skin between some fingers or toes may be fused or "webbed" (cutaneous syndactyly). A benign mass or lesion in the brain called a hypothalamic hamartoma is characteristic of this disorder. In many cases, these benign tumors do not cause any medical problems; however, some hypothalamic hamartomas lead to seizures or hormone abnormalities that can be life-threatening in infancy. Other features of Pallister–Hall syndrome include a malformation of the airway called a bifid epiglottis, laryngeal cleft, an obstruction of the anal opening (imperforate anus), and kidney abnormalities. Although the signs and symptoms of this disorder vary from mild to severe, only a small percentage of affected people have serious complications.

Seizures 
The most common type of seizure from this disorder of that occur is known as gelastic epilepsy or "laughing" seizures.
Seizures may begin at any age but usually before three or four years of age. The seizures usually start with laughter and the laughter is often described as being "hollow" or "empty" and unpleasant. The laughter occurs suddenly, comes on for no obvious reason and is usually completely out of place. Other seizure types such as tonic-clonic and absence seizures may also appear due to temporal lobe epilepsy.

Transmission
Pallister-Hall Syndrome is transmitted in an autosomal dominant pattern, wherein the gene mutation overrides normal gene development. The GLI3 gene provides instructions for making a protein that controls gene expression, which is a process that regulates whether genes are turned on or off in particular cells. By interacting with certain genes at specific times during development, the GLI3 protein plays a role in the normal shaping (patterning) of many organs and tissues before birth. Defects in the same gene also cause Greig cephalopolysyndactyly syndrome.

Mutations that cause Pallister–Hall syndrome typically lead to the production of an abnormally short version of the GLI3 protein. Unlike the normal GLI3 protein, which can turn target genes on or off, the short protein can only turn off (repress) target genes. Researchers are working to determine how this change in the protein's function affects early development. 

One copy of the altered gene in each cell is sufficient to cause the disorder. The child of one parent with PHS would have a 50% chance of inheriting the gene that causes the syndrome. Other cases result from new mutations in the gene and occur in people with no history of the disorder in their family.

Diagnosis
Central characteristics of the disorder include polydactyly (extra digits on limbs) with possible cutaneous syndactyly (fusion or webbed skin between some fingers or toes)  and a hypothalamic hamartoma (HH), a rare brain lesion on the hypothalamus. While HH may occur spontaneously, the presence of polysyndactyly warrants investigation for PHS. Currently, clinical diagnosis is through a brain MRI and genetic sequencing for GLI 13 gene, which is known to cause Pallister-Hall Syndrome. Defects in the same gene also cause Greig cephalopolysyndactyly syndrome. Thus, differentiation of the disorders needs to be considered in genetic sequencing.

Treatment

Treatment is limited to outward symptoms and effects of the hypothalamic hamartoma. Surgery may be required at birth to fix imperforate anus and address endocrine abnormalities. Selective removal of extra digits may occur in early childhood. Parents and medical practitioners should monitor for signs of endocrine disruption in sleep, eating, or hormonal issues, such as precocious puberty caused by the hypothalamic hamartoma. 

People with Pallister-Hall may experience less severe seizures than people with only the hypothalamic hamartoma. Seizures may be treated with anticonvulsants. However, gelastic seizures are often intractable and may not benefit from such therapy. Resection of the hypothalamic hamartoma has improved seizure control and hypothalamic function in some patients. The benefits of surgery should be weighed against the side effects.

References

External links 

  GeneReviews/NCBI/NIH/UW entry on Pallister–Hall Syndrome
 Genetics Home Reference

Rare syndromes
Autosomal dominant disorders
Transcription factor deficiencies
Diseases named for discoverer